HMS Velox (D34) was a V-class destroyer built in 1918. She served in the last year of the First World War and was engaged in the Second Ostend Raid. During the interwar period she underwent a refit and continued serving during the Second World War as a long range convoy escort in the battle of the Atlantic. Post-war Velox was broken up in the reduction of the fleet. Sailors of the ship took part in the Royal Navy mutiny of 1919.

Bibliography 
Notes

References 
 
 
 
 
 
 
 
 
 
 
 
 
 
 
 

 

V and W-class destroyers of the Royal Navy
Ships built on the River Wear
1917 ships
World War I destroyers of the United Kingdom
World War II destroyers of the United Kingdom